Lend Me Your Husband is a 1935 British comedy film directed by Frederick Hayward and starring John Stuart, Nora Swinburne and Nancy Burne. It was made at Walton Studios as a quota quickie.

The film's sets were designed by the art director Don Russell.

Cast
 John Stuart as Jeff Green  
 Nora Swinburne as Virgie Green  
 Nancy Burne as Ba-ba  
 Annie Esmond as Mother  
 Evan Thomas as Tony

References

Bibliography
 Low, Rachael. Filmmaking in 1930s Britain. George Allen & Unwin, 1985.
 Wood, Linda. British Films, 1927-1939. British Film Institute, 1986.

External links

1935 films
British comedy films
1935 comedy films
Films shot at Nettlefold Studios
Quota quickies
British black-and-white films
RKO Pictures films
1930s English-language films
1930s British films